Richard Bennett is an American guitarist, composer, and record producer. In addition to his 5 solo albums, and his recordings with Neil Diamond and Mark Knopfler, he has been featured as a performer and producer on many albums by other artists.

Solo albums
 2004: Themes from a Rainy Decade (Moderne Shellac)
 2008: Code Red Cloud Nine (Moderne Shellac)
 2010: Valley of the Sun (Moderne Shellac)
 2013: For the Newly Blue (Moderne Shellac)
 2015: Contrary Cocktail (Moderne Shellac)
2018: Ballads in Otherness (Moderne Shellac)

With Neil Diamond
 1974: Serenade (Columbia)
 1976: Beautiful Noise (Columbia)
 1977: I'm Glad You're Here with Me Tonight (Columbia)
 1978: You Don't Bring Me Flowers (Columbia)
 1979: September Morn (Columbia)
 1981: On the Way to the Sky (Columbia)
 1982: Heartlight (Columbia)
 1984: Primitive (Columbia)
 1986: Headed for the Future (Columbia)
 1988: The Best Years of Our Lives (Columbia)
 2014: Melody Road (Capitol)
 2016: Acoustic Christmas (Capitol)

With Mark Knopfler
 1996: Golden Heart (Warner Bros.)
 2000: Sailing to Philadelphia (Warner Bros.)
 2002: The Ragpicker's Dream (Warner Bros.)
 2004: Shangri-La (Warner Bros.)
 2006: All the Roadrunning (Mercury) with Emmylou Harris
 2009: Get Lucky (Reprise)
 2012: Privateering (Mercury)
2015: Tracker (Mercury)
2018: Down the Road Wherever (Virgin EMI)

As composer
 1988: Steve Earle - Copperhead Road (Uni) - track 8, ""Waiting on You" (co-written with Steve Earle)
 1991: Steve Earle and the Dukes - Shut Up and Die Like an Aviator (MCA) - track 2, "Good Ol' Boy (Gettin' Tough)" (co-written with Steve Earle)

As producer
 1986: Steve Earle - Guitar Town (MCA) associate producer
 1987: Steve Earle and the Dukes - Exit 0 (MCA) co-producer
 1989: Emmylou Harris - Bluebird (Reprise) co-producer
 1990: Emmylou Harris - Brand New Dance (Reprise) co-producer
 1992: Emmylou Harris and the Nash Ramblers - At the Ryman (Reprise)
 1994: Marty Brown - Cryin', Lovin', Leavin''' (MCA)
 1995: Kim Richey - Kim Richey (Mercury)
 1996: Steve Earle - I Feel Alright (Warner Bros.) co-producer
 2005: various artists - Train of Love: A Tribute to Johnny Cash (CMH)
 2009: Phil Lee - So Long, It's Been Good to Know You (Palookaville)
 2017: Steve Earle and the Dukes - So You Wannabe An Outlaw (Warner Bros.)

Also appears on
1972 - 1973
 1972: Four Tops - Keeper of the Castle (Dunhill)
 1972: Alex Harvey - Souvenirs (Capitol)
 1973: Vikki Carr - Ms. America (Columbia)
 1973: Jim Grady - Jim Grady (20th Century)
 1973: Chuck Jackson - Through All Times (ABC)
 1973: Billy Joel - Piano Man (Columbia)
 1973: Barbara Keith - Barbara Keith (Reprise)
 1973: The Partridge Family - Bulletin Board (Bell)
 1973: Austin Roberts - The Last Thing On My Mind (Chelsea)
 1973: T-Bone Walker - Very Rare (Reprise)
 1973: Andy Williams - Solitaire (Columbia)

1974 - 1979
 1974: Karl Erikson - I Am Next (United Artists)
 1974: Lobo - Just A Singer (Big Tree)
 1974: Billy Joel - Streetlife Serenade (Columbia)
 1974: Dave Mason - Dave Mason (Columbia)
 1974: Kenny Rankin - Silver Morning (Little David
 1974: Jim Stafford - Jim Stafford (MGM)
 1974: Ringo Starr - Goodnight Vienna (Apple)
 1975: Eric Andersen - Be True to You (Arista)
 1975: Jim Stafford - Not Just Another Pretty Foot (MGM)
 1976: Bellamy Brothers - Let Your Love Flow (Curb)
 1977: Michael Omartian - Adam Again (Myrrh)
 1977: Helen Reddy - Ear Candy (Capitol)
 1978: Bellamy Brothers - Beautiful Friends (Warner Bros.)
 1978: Helen Reddy - We'll Sing in the Sunshine (Capitol)
 1978: Neil Diamond - You Don't Bring Me Flowers (Columbia)
 1979: Dave Lambert - Framed (Polydor)

1980 - 1985
 1980: Allan Clarke - Legendary Heroes (Elektra)
 1981: Rodney Crowell - Rodney Crowell (Warner Bros.)
 1981: Carole Bayer Sager - Sometimes Late at Night (Boardwalk)
 1982: Rosanne Cash - Somewhere in the Stars (Columbia)
 1983: Sissy Spacek - Hangin' Up My Heart (Atlantic)
 1983: "Weird Al" Yankovic - "Weird Al" Yankovic (Rock 'n Roll)
 1984: Vince Gill - Turn Me Loose (RCA)
 1985: Vince Gill - The Things That Matter (RCA)
 1985: George Strait - Something Special (MCA)

1986 - 1999
 1986: Mac Davis - Somewhere in America (MCA)
 1986: Waylon Jennings - Will the Wolf Survive (MCA)
 1986: Nicolette Larson - Rose of My Heart (MCA)
 1986: George Strait - #7 (MCA)
 1986: Rodney Crowell - Street Language (CBS)
 1987: Waylon Jennings - Hangin' Tough (MCA)
 1987: Conway Twitty - Borderline (MCA)
 1987: Ricky Van Shelton - Wild-Eyed Dream (Columbia)
 1989: Lyle Lovett and his Large Band - Lyle Lovett and His Large Band (MCA / Curb)
 1989: Juice Newton - Ain't Gonna Cry (RCA)
 1990: Rosanne Cash - Rosanne Cash (Columbia)
 1991: Vince Gill - Pocket Full of Gold (MCA)
 1992: Alabama - American Pride (RCA Victor)
 1992: Vince Gill - I Still Believe In You (MCA)
 1992: Joan Baez - Play Me Backwards (Virgin)
 1994: Hal Ketchum - Every Little Word (Curb)
 1995: Emmylou Harris - Wrecking Ball (Elektra)
 1995: Billy Pilgrim - Bloom (Atlantic)
 1997: Matraca Berg - Sunday Morning to Sunday Nights (Rising)
 1997: Phillips Craig & Dean - Where Strength Begins (Star Song Communications)
 1998: Allison Moorer - Alabama Song (MCA)

2000 - 2009
 2000: Allison Moorer - The Hardest Part (MCA Nashville)
 2000: Trisha Yearwood - Real Live Woman (MCA Nashville)
 2000: Wynonna Judd - New Day Dawning (Curb)
 2002: Amy Grant - Legacy... Hymns and Faith (Word / A&M)
 2004: Cerys Matthews - Cockahoop (Rough Trade / Blanco y Negro)
 2004: Mary Chapin Carpenter - Between Here and Gone (Columbia)
 2005: Amy Grant - Rock of Ages... Hymns and Faith (Word)
 2005: Miranda Lambert - Kerosene (Epic)
 2005: Rodney Crowell - The Outsider (Columbia)
 2006: Eric Church - Sinners Like Me (Capitol Nashville)
 2006: Vince Gill - These Days (MCA)
 2006: Lee Hazlewood - Cake or Death (Ever)
 2007: Miranda Lambert - Crazy Ex-Girlfriend (Sony Music)
 2008: Eric Brace and Peter Cooper - You Don't Have to Like Them Both (Red Beet)
 2008: Emmylou Harris - All I Intended to Be (Nonesuch)
 2009: Miranda Lambert - Revolution (Columbia)

2010 - present
 2010: Allison Moorer - Crows (Rykodisc)
 2011: Eric Brace and Peter Cooper - Master Session (Red Beet)
 2011: Miranda Lambert - Four the Record (MCA)
 2011: Vince Gill - Guitar Slinger (Hump)
 2011: Matraca Berg - The Dreaming Fields (Dualtone)
 2012: Pistol Annies - Hell on Heels (Columbia)
 2012: Willie Nelson and Friends - Stars & Guitars (Lost Highway)
 2013: Sheryl Crow - Feels Like Home (Old Green Barn / Sea Gayle Music / Warner Bros.)
 2013: Ashley Monroe - Like a Rose (Warner Bros.)
 2014: Miranda Lambert - Platinum (RCA)
 2014: Beth Nielsen Chapman - Uncovered (BNC)
 2014: Garth Brooks - Man Against Machine (RCA Nashville)
 2014: Josh Thompson - Turn it Up (Show Dog)
 2015: Dawes - All Your Favorite Bands (HUB)
 2015: Amy Grant - Be Still and Know... Hymns & Faith (Universal)
 2015: Ashley Monroe - The Blade (Warner Music Nashville)
 2015: Spooner Oldham - Pot Luck (Light in the Attic)
 2016: Paul Burch - Meridian Rising (Plowboy)]
 2016: Mo Pitney - Behind This Guitar (Curb)
 2016: Shawn Colvin and Steve Earle - Colvin and Earle (Fantasy)
 2016: Vince Gill - Down to My Last Bad Habit (MCA Nashville / Universal)
 2016: Darrell Scott - Couchville Sessions (Full Light)
 2017: Rodney Crowell - Close Ties (New West)
 2017: Steve Earle and the Dukes - So You Wannabe an Outlaw (Warner Bros.)
 2017: Alison Krauss - Windy City (Capitol / Decca)
 2018: Tom Rush - Voices'' (Appleseed)

References

External links 
 Official website
 
 

Discographies of American artists
Rock music discographies